Visual is the third studio album produced by the Dominican based electronic rock band Tabu Tek. This second production was released on the year 2003 in Santo Domingo, Dominican Republic. The fourth song of the album, Compadre Pedro Juan, is a rock tribute to Luis Alberti, father of merengue music. The song was previously set to be released in the merengue tribute Rockero Hasta La Tambora made by Dominican rock bands. The album is distinguished by the more rock based sound with less of the electronica aspect found in their previous production Girar. Nevertheless, it was well received and played in rock stations around the country.

Track listing
"Andas"
"In the Sky"
"Palabras Caen"
"Se"
"Compadre Pedro Juan" (a tribute to Luis Alberti's merengue classic)
"Visual"
"Amanecer"
"Un Nuevo Sol"
"Manto Azul"
"Luz"
"Deseare"

2003 albums